Brak Airport  is an airport serving Brak, the capital of the Wadi al Shatii District in Libya.

Runway length does not include a  displaced threshold on each end.

See also
Transport in Libya
List of airports in Libya

References

External links
OpenStreetMap - Brack Airport
OurAirports - Brak Airport
FallingRain - Brach Airport

Google Earth

Airports in Libya